Three Is a Family is a 1944 American comedy film directed by Edward Ludwig and starring Marjorie Reynolds, Charlie Ruggles, and Fay Bainter. The film was nominated for an Academy Award for Best Sound Recording (W. V. Wolfe).

Cast

 Marjorie Reynolds as Kitty Mitchell
 Charlie Ruggles as Sam Whitaker
 Fay Bainter as Frances Whittaker
 Helen Broderick as Irma
 Arthur Lake as Archie Whittaker
 Hattie McDaniel as Maid
 Jeff Donnell as Hazel Whittaker
 John Philliber as Dr. Bartell
 Walter Catlett as Barney Meeker
 Clarence Kolb as Mr. Steele
 Else Janssen as Adelaide 
 Renie Riano as Genevieve
 Warren Hymer as Coolie
 Clyde Fillmore as Mr. Spencer
 Christian Rub as Bellboy

References

External links
 
 

1944 films
1944 comedy films
American black-and-white films
American comedy films
American films based on plays
1940s English-language films
Films directed by Edward Ludwig
Films produced by Sol Lesser
United Artists films
1940s American films